Elektronika VM-12 was the first Soviet VHS-compatible videocassette recorder. It was capable to record SECAM-IIIB D/K (OIRT), PAL and black-and-white video on a 12,65-mm wide magnetic tape.

Elektronika VM-12 was 480х367х136 mm in size and weighted 10 kg.

PAL SP - 2,339±0,5%

References

Recording devices
Video hardware
Science and technology in the Soviet Union
Products introduced in 1984
Ministry of the Electronics Industry (Soviet Union) products